
Gmina Masłowice is a rural gmina (administrative district) in Radomsko County, Łódź Voivodeship, in central Poland.

Villages
Gmina Masłowice contains the villages and settlements of Bartodzieje, Borki, Chełmo, Granice, Huta Przerębska, Jaskółki, Kalinki, Kawęczyn, Koconia, Kolonia Przerąb, Korytno, Kraszewice, Krery, Łączkowice, Masłowice, Ochotnik, Przerąb, Strzelce Małe, Tworowice and Wola Przerębska.

Neighbouring gminas
Gmina Masłowice is bordered by the gminas of Gorzkowice, Kobiele Wielkie, Kodrąb, Łęki Szlacheckie, Przedbórz, Ręczno and Wielgomłyny.

References
Polish official population figures 2006

Maslowice
Radomsko County